Akatsievo is a village in Vidin Municipality, Vidin Province, Bulgaria.

References

Villages in Vidin Province
Vidin Municipality